Il Santo is an Italian novel written by Antonio Fogazzaro and published by Baldini & Castoldi in 1905 in Milan. The novel is the third and last of a trilogy in which Piccolo Mondo Antico is the first and Piccolo Mondo Moderno is the second. Despite the fact that Fogazzaro was a devout and loyal Catholic, Il Santo was listed on the Index Librorum Prohibitorum. The Vatican's prohibition of this novel helped Fogazzaro achieve a worldwide reputation.

Plot summary
As a sequel to Piccolo Mondo Moderno, the novel takes up the story of
Piero Maironi.

After a dramatic meeting with Jeanne Dessale, the reformed Maironi (now Benedetto) takes refuge as a monk in a religious community in the mountain village of Jenne and acquires a reputation among the peasants there as a saint who sometimes works miracles of healing. Bendetto calls for a thorough reform of Christian spirituality and thought. Benedetto/Maironi's program of spiritual reform is developed by Fogazzaro from ideas of the Italian philosopher Antonio Rosmini. Benedetto forms with Don Clemente and Professor Giovanni Selva (in whom the critic Jean Lebrec recognizes Friedrich von Hügel, a close friend of Fogazzaro) the nucleus of a latter-day Cénacle who call themselves Le Catacombe.

Benedetto goes to Rome and works among the poor of the Trastevere and Testaccio quarters, but then gains notoriety and becomes enmeshed in clerical and anti-clerical politics. Eventually Benedetto meets with Pope Pius X.

Criticism

Translations
G. P. Putnam published in 1906 an English translation (The Saint) by Mary Agnetti Prichard.<ref>{{cite book|author=Fogazzaro, A.|title=The Saint, English translation from the Italian by Mary Agnetti Prichard|publisher=G. P. Putnam|location=New York|url=https://catalog.hathitrust.org/Record/100542276}}</ref> Hachette published in 1906 a French translation (Le Saint) by Georges Hérelle. Georg Müller Verlag published in 1906 a German translation (Der Heilige'') by Maria Gagliardi.

References

1905 Italian novels
Novels set in Italy
Novels by Antonio Fogazzaro